A Takeoff Acceleration Monitoring System automates the pilot monitoring of Distance to Go (DTG), "to sense, in a timely fashion the development of insufficient acceleration, which would extend the takeoff roll, perhaps precipitously".

Over the years, recommendations have been made to develop a Take Off Performance Management System.  The NLR and NASA developed TOPMS prototypes. However, these systems were never operationally introduced.

EASA established two working groups (WGs) to address this issue. WG-88 focussed on the specification and standardization of On-Board Weight and Balance Systems 
(OBWBS), an ongoing effort for what is considered to be a feasible option. WG-94 focussed on standards and operational conditions for a TOPMS; it WG-94 was concluded early 2017, considering that TOPMS was not feasible, in particular due to limitations in technology and data availability. 

A version suitable for detecting gross errors, which can be integrated in existing avionics, has been proposed by National Aerospace Laboratory (NLR), KLM, and Martinair. 

A 2019 research paper explores the cause of a July 2017 serious incident, caused by erroneous data entry, where such system could have been useful. It "summarises a basic takeoff acceleration monitoring system and the effect this would have had on the July 2017 event".

Related inventions 
 Airplane takeoff and landing performance monitoring system

References 

Aircraft instruments
Aircraft components
Avionics
Runway safety